Monanthotaxis is an Afrotropical plant genus with some 56 species, belonging to the Annonaceae. They are native to the tropics and subtropics of southeastern Africa and Madagascar.

Species

References

Bibliography
 Schatz, G. E., et al., 2011. Catalogue of the Vascular Plants of Madagascar. Monogr. Syst. Bot. Missouri Bot. Gard.

Annonaceae
Annonaceae genera
Taxa named by Henri Ernest Baillon